Causation in Sciences Project (CauSci) is a four-year interdisciplinary research project on the field of causation in the philosophy of science, funded by the Norwegian Research Council (NFR) and hosted by the School of Economics and Business at the Norwegian University of Life Sciences (NMBU).

Causality is one of the key concepts employed in the sciences. In our attempt to understand and influence the world around us, one of the main things we need to know is what causes what. Once we understand the causal connections, we are in a position to explain what has gone before, predict what will come in the future, and intervene to produce the outcomes we require. While scientists deal with the concrete details, it is philosophers who consider in the abstract what it is for one thing to cause another. The aim of this project is to bring together that abstract philosophical approach to causation with a more concrete understanding of the work actually undertaken by the practitioners of the sciences.

CauSci is based on a dispositional theory of causation, in which a cause is understood as event that disposes towards an effect or outcome. A further key theme for causation comes from that this theory, namely Reductionism versus holism in the sciences. Many philosophers have been attracted to a reductive view of nature in which everything is to be explained ultimately in terms of subatomic particles. But is there any evidence for the success of reductionism in the sciences or is the view a mere philosophers’ fancy? It appears, on the contrary, that many sciences are premised on holistic phenomena that cannot be reduced to the sum of their parts: at certain levels of nature, new causal powers emerge that cannot be explained at relatively lower levels. Nature is stratified.

The project aims to test the existing dispositional theory of causation against four key sciences in which the issues of causation, emergentism and reduction are central: physics, biology, psychology and the social sciences. While the theory aims to offer new insights that explain practice within these sciences, the theory in return will gain a more empirically informed grounding. A team of Norwegian and international researchers in these four fields have been recruited as collaborators to the project.

Methodology 
The methodological basis of the project is that philosophy should not dictate to science and nor should science dictate to philosophy. While these two disciplines have the same subject matter - understanding the world - they aim to answer very different questions. What can be achieved, however, is a reflective equilibrium: a unified view of causation that is both philosophically and empirically satisfactory. It is all well and good for philosophers to decide a priori what would make a good theory of causation, but what use is that if scientists are dealing with something else? By considering both the abstract and the concrete together in unison, an account can emerge that is both philosophically and empirically adequate and complete.

Four central sciences have been selected against which to test and improve the causal dispositionalist hypothesis. The approach will be to apply the theory to some of the key problems within that science. It will be taken as a sign of success for the theory if it is able to solve those problems or at the very least offer some illumination of them. The sciences are selected on the basis of their centrality but also their diversity. Theories of causation are sometimes criticised on the basis that they explain only causation in physics, for instance, but with no indication of how they could apply to biological, social or mental causation. The four sciences selected therefore cover some of the most important divisions across human thinking: matter, life, mind and society.

Notes

References 

 Born, M., 1949. Natural Philosophy of Cause and Chance, Oxford University Press, London.
 Mackie, John L., 1988. The Cement of the Universe: A study in Causation. Clarendon Press, Oxford, England, 1988.
 Molnar, G. 2006. Powers: A Study in Metaphysics, Edited by S. Mumford, Clarendon Press, Oxford, England. 
 Mumford, S. and Anjum, R. L., 2012. Fundamentals of Causality. In: Rouse, W., Boff, K. and Sanderson, P., eds., Complex Socio-Technical Systems: Understanding and Influencing the Causality of Change IOS Press.
 Mumford, S., 2012. Metaphysics: A Very Short Introduction Oxford University Press.
 Mumford, S. and ANJUM, R.L., 2011. Getting causes from powers Oxford University Press.
 Riegelman, R. (1979). "Contributory cause: Unnecessary and insufficient". Postgraduate medicine 66 (2): 177–179. .

External links 
 CauSci

Norwegian University of Life Sciences
Philosophy academics
Research projects
Research Council of Norway
Philosophy organizations